Yinzhou Avenue Station is an underground metro station in Ningbo, Zhejiang, China. It is situated on the crossing of Yongor Avenue and Wancheng Road. Construction of the station started in December 2010 and it began service on September 26, 2015.

Exits 
Yinzhou Avenue Station has 3 exits.

References 

Railway stations in Zhejiang
Railway stations in China opened in 2015
Ningbo Rail Transit stations